Mid-Minch Gaelic is a currently developing pan-regional form of Scottish Gaelic, loosely based on the surviving dialects of Scottish Gaelic with considerable numbers of speakers. It has also been referred to by a number of other names, such as Standard Hebridean, BBC Gaelic, Standard Gaelic or Mixed Gaelic.

These are mostly concentrated around the North-West Highlands and Islands, including Wester Ross, the Outer Hebrides and Skye. As these cluster around The Minch, this variety has been dubbed Mid-Minch Gaelic; compare Mid-Atlantic English. The Gaelic term  ("Mid-sea Gaelic") is somewhat wider and can be seen to incorporate varieties of Gaelic spoken further south, such as Tiree, Coll, Mull or Islay.

East Sutherland or Perthshire) and greater migration and urbanisation, leading to dialect mixing.

References 

Scottish Gaelic dialects
Dialect levelling